Dəlilər (also, Dalliar and Dallyar) is a village and municipality in the Saatly Rayon of Azerbaijan.

Population
It has a population of 2,049.

References 

Populated places in Saatly District